Javier Ariel Rosada (born 11 April 1978 in Campana, Buenos Aires Province, Argentina) is an Argentine midfielder. He is known for his uncompromising tackling and resolutely defensive playing style.

Rosada began to play professionally in Argentina in 1995 with Boca Juniors in the Argentine Primera División. In 1998, he joined the Dutch club AZ Alkmaar, but returned to Boca after one year. In the same year, he joined another Argentine team, Chacarita Juniors, in Primera B Nacional until 2003 when joined Newell's Old Boys in Rosario. In 2005, he left for the "Diablos Rojos", Toluca. He was then transferred from Celta to play for Boca Juniors.

Honours

External links
 
 
 Argentine Primera statistics at Fútbol XXI 

1978 births
Living people
Argentine footballers
Association football midfielders
Sportspeople from Buenos Aires Province
Boca Juniors footballers
Chacarita Juniors footballers
Newell's Old Boys footballers
Club Atlético Banfield footballers
Olimpo footballers
AZ Alkmaar players
Deportivo Toluca F.C. players
RC Celta de Vigo players
Argentine Primera División players
Segunda División players
Liga MX players
Argentine expatriate footballers
Expatriate footballers in Spain
Expatriate footballers in the Netherlands
Expatriate footballers in Mexico